Phillip W. Martin (born January 24, 1948) is an American former politician who served in the Kansas State Senate from 1985 to 1996. He was succeeded by Jim Barone.

References

Democratic Party Kansas state senators
20th-century American politicians
People from Pittsburg, Kansas
1948 births
Living people